is a Japanese football player previously playing for Albirex Niigata FC (Singapore) in the S.League. He is currently a free agent after playing for 2 seasons at the club.

Career
The midfielder signed in December 2011 for Albirex Niigata Singapore FC in Singapore's S.League. A regular fixture in the starting lineup, effective in set pieces. Primarily a central midfielder, he would at times operate on either flanks.

References

 Contract with Masatake Sato.
 Masatake Sato renews contract.
 Masatake Sato is released from Albirex Niigata FC (S).

1991 births
Living people
Japan Soccer College players
Albirex Niigata Singapore FC players
Japanese footballers
Japanese expatriate footballers
Expatriate footballers in Singapore
Association football midfielders